Yrke or Yrkje is a village in Tysvær municipality in Rogaland county, Norway. The village is located at the western end of the Yrkefjorden, a branch off of the main Vindafjorden. The village lies on a small isthmus between the Yrkefjorden and the Skjoldafjorden, along the County Road 515, the only road over the isthmus connecting the peninsula to the mainland.

History
The Yrke area was administratively part of the municipality of Skjold since 1838 when municipalities were created in Norway. On 1 January 1965, Skjold municipality was dissolved and its territory divided up between three neighboring municipalities. The southwestern part of Skjold, which included the districts of Yrke, Dueland, and Grinde with a total of 1,133 inhabitants were merged into Tysvær municipality.

References

Villages in Rogaland
Tysvær